Alberto Fernández Calderón (born  1926) was a Peruvian basketball player. He competed in the men's tournament at the 1948 Summer Olympics.

References

External links
 

1920s births
Possibly living people
Peruvian men's basketball players
Olympic basketball players of Peru
Basketball players at the 1948 Summer Olympics
Place of birth missing
Year of birth uncertain
1950 FIBA World Championship players